Local government in Salem comprises three tiers of administration in the west district of Tamil Nadu, below the central government of India. Salem district was the first district created in India. 

Salem district consists of 1 Municipal Corporation, 6 Municipalities and 30 Town Panchayats.

Municipal Corporation 
There is one Corporation in Salem district, namely Salem City Municipal Corporation.

Larger cities of Tamil Nadu are governed by city municipal corporations (Tamil: மாநகராட்சிகள்). This city alone houses one-third of the urban population of the state. The Corporation consists of a council of elected councillors from each ward and a presiding officer, the Mayor, who is also an elected representative. Apart from them, an executive authority referred as Corporation Commissioner is also vested with administrative powers.

Municipalities 
There are 6 Municipalities in Salem district. 

Municipalities (Tamil: நகராட்சிகள்) fall next to the city corporations. Municipalities have four categories based on their annual income and population. These include special-grade municipalities, selection-grade municipalities, grade I and grade II municipalities. Their elected representatives include ward councillors and a presiding officer, Municipal Chairperson. The Municipal Commissioner is the executive authority.

 Attur
 Idappadi
 Mettur
 Narasingapuram
Edaganasalai
Tharamangalam

Town Panchayats 
There are 30 Town Panchayats in Salem district.

Town panchayat is the body of government for areas in transition form ‘rural’ to ‘urban’. Tamil Nadu is the first state to introduce such a classification in urban local bodies. The state has 561 town panchayats. Town panchayats are upgraded to Grade III municipalities if they are found to be eligible. They are categorised in a similar way to that of Municipalities depending on the income criteria and population. Town panchayat councils include elected ward councillors and their presiding officer, Town panchayat chairperson. The Executive Officer is the executive authority for town panchayats.

 Ayothiapattinam
 Gangavalli
 Kannankurichi
 Thammampatti
 Attayampatti
 Jalakandapuram
 Elampillai

 Kolathur
 Konganapuram
 Mecheri
 Omalur
 Panaimarathupatti
 Petanaickenpalayam
 Sankagiri
 Sivathapuram

 Vazhapadi
 Veerakkalpudur
 Belur

 Kadayampatti
 Karuppur
 Mallur
 Sentharapatti
 Thedavur
 Thevur
 Veeraganur
 Ethapur
 Arasiramani
 Nangavalli
 Poolampatti
 Vanavasi
 Vellalapuram

Elections 

Elections to the local bodies in Tamil Nadu, held once in five years, are conducted by Tamil Nadu State Election Commission. Both direct and indirect elections apply for local bodies. Direct election posts include:

 Urban bodies
 Corporation Mayor
 Municipality/Town Panchayat Chairperson
 Corporation/Municipality/Town Panchayat Councillor
 Rural bodies
 Village Panchayat President
 District Panchayat councillor
 Panchayat Union councillor
 Village Panchayat Ward Member

Indirect election posts include Chairpersons of District panchayats and Panchayat unions, Deputy Mayor of corporations, Vice-Chairpersons of Municipalities and Town panchayats. Various statutory/standing committees are also elected by the way of indirect elections.

Village Panchayats 
There are 385 village panchayats of 20 blocks in Salem district.

Functions 

Local bodies are completely responsible for the developmental administration in the state. Maintenance of clean environment, primary health facilities gain the foremost importance. Apart from them water supply, roads and buildings, storm-water drains, street lighting, solid waste management, sanitation and bus-stands cum commercial complexes etc are the prime duties of the local bodies.[19] Centrally sponsored schemes like Mahatma Gandhi National Rural Employment Guarantee Scheme (MGNREGS), Indira Awaas Yojana (IAY), Member of Parliament Local Area Development Scheme (MPLADS), etc, and State-funded Schemes like Tamil Nadu Village Habitation Improvement Scheme (THAI), Member of Legislative Assembly Constituency Development Scheme (MLACDS), Self-Sufficiency Scheme, Solar-Powered Green-House Scheme are also undertaken by the local bodies.[20] Sources of revenue for these local bodies are mainly from central and state governments. Local bodies also have the power of taxation which include house tax, profession tax, property tax etc. Apart from these they levy fees for specific building plan and layout approvals, water charges, sewerage charges etc.

References 

Salem district
Local government in Tamil Nadu 
Local elections in Tamil Nadu 
Salem, Tamil Nadu-related lists